Penly is a former commune in the Seine-Maritime department in the Normandy region in northern France. On 1 January 2016, it was merged into the new commune of Petit-Caux.

Geography

Population

Places of interest
 The Penly Nuclear Power Plant on the coast, with 2 reactors of 1300MW each.
 The church of St. Denis, dating from the twelfth century.

See also
Communes of the Seine-Maritime department

References

Former communes of Seine-Maritime